In chess, an ideal mate is a checkmate position that is a special form of model mate. While in a model mate, each piece on the mating player's side (possibly excluding the king and pawns depending on context) participates in the mate, an ideal mate involves all the pieces of the mated player's as well, typically by blocking the mated king's field of movement so that it cannot escape. As in a model mate, an ideal mate also involves the mating pieces attacking the vacant squares around the mated king's exactly once, and not attacking the mated player's other pieces occupying the king's field of movement.

For example, in the second position at right, white delivers an ideal mate. The mate is delivered with the white rook, and the black king cannot stay or move to d4 or f4. The white king prevents the black king from escaping to d5 or f5 and prevents capture of the knight, while that knight prevents escape to d3 and f3, and the black rook blocks escape to e3, while not being attacked by any of White's pieces.

The very restrictive definition of an ideal mate means that it rarely ends actual chess games, excepting some basic checkmates (such as king and rook against a lone king), but ideal mates are a common theme in chess problems, like the one at right.

References
 

Chess checkmates
Chess problems